Burnett's Diner, also known as Main Street Lunch, S&K Diner, and Chatham Cafe, is a historic converted streetcar diner located at Chatham in Pittsylvania County, Virginia.  It was built in 1923, and used as a streetcar in Danville, Virginia.  It was brought to Chatham in 1939, and converted for use as a diner.  It was restored in the 1980s.

It was listed on the National Register of Historic Places in 1996.

References

External links
 Burnett's Streetcar Diner, 19 South Main Street, Chatham, Pittsylvania County, VA at the Historic American Buildings Survey (HABS)

Diners on the National Register of Historic Places
Diners in Virginia
Commercial buildings on the National Register of Historic Places in Virginia
Commercial buildings completed in 1939
Buildings and structures in Pittsylvania County, Virginia
National Register of Historic Places in Pittsylvania County, Virginia
Historic American Buildings Survey in Virginia